Giggle Comics is an American comics anthology. It was originally published by Creston Publications, which became an imprint of American Comics Group (ACG) in 1943. Giggle Comics had many stories with funny animals, mirroring a wider trend.

Publication history 
Giggle Comics was published under the Creston imprint for issues #1–63; issues #64-onward were under the ACG name. The title published 99 issues, from Oct. 1943 – Jan. 1955, when it changed its name to Spencer Spook, publishing two more issues before finally being cancelled in June 1955.

Ongoing features 
 Superkatt — Long-running series by Dan Gordon, under the pen name "Dang." Superkatt is an anthropomorphic cat who wears a bowtie, bonnet, and diaper as a superhero costume.

References

1943 comics debuts
1955 comics endings
American Comics Group titles
Comics magazines published in the United States
Defunct American comics
Golden Age comics titles
Magazines established in 1943
Magazines disestablished in 1955
Magazines published in New York City